Reginald "Reggie" Davani (born 5 February 1980) is a former Papua New Guinea footballer, who is currently acting as senior men's coach at Western Pride FC.

He is Papua New Guinea's all-time record international goal scorer with 13 goals.

Club career
Davani was a product of the then Brisbane Lions (now Queensland Lions Soccer Club) youth team, before graduating to the senior side. In 1999, he moved to Ipswich Knights, scoring 15 goals in 23 matches, and Taringa Rovers. He then spent several seasons in the New Zealand football leagues, most notably at Auckland City. Davani then transferred to Solomon Islands side Kossa FC, with whom he won a runners-up medal in the 2007–08 OFC Champions League, before moving to Coburg United in Australia's Victorian Premier League for the remainder of the 2008 season. After his release from Logan United, in June 2010 Davani joined Brisbane Olympic. Just before the commencement of the 2011 season, Davani joined Victorian club Sunshine George Cross.

International career
Davani made his debut for the Papua New Guinea national football team in 1998 at the Melanesian Cup in Santo Vanuatu, against the Solomon Islands. He played in four World Cup qualification games in 2004, in which he scored 6 goals. He currently holds the record for the most International goals for Papua New Guinea (13). His younger brother Alex Davani, also plays for the national team. Davani is a dual International, having represented Australia in futsal and was a member of the 2008 Australian Futsal World Cup squad.

International goals 

Scores and results list Papua New Guinea's goal tally first, score column indicates score after each Papua New Guinea goal.

Coaching career 
Davani was Papua New Guinea Assistant coach between 2014 and 2017. During this time Papua New Guinea finished runners up in the OFC Nations Cup.

Davani returned to Ipswich in 2018 to become the Senior Men's Assistant coach and U20 Men's coach at Western Pride FC. Davani became the acting-Senior Men's coach after the departure of Graham Harvey.

Honours

Club 

University Inter
Port Moresby Premier League: 2001, 2003

Auckland City
New Zealand Football Championship: 2005, 2006
Oceania Club Championship: 2005

Bay Olympic
New Zealand Nth Premier League: 2006

Kossa FC
Australian Futsal National (Queensland Men's): 2001

Individual 
2005 Finalist – Papua New Guinean Sportsman of the Year2004 Finalist – Oceania Player of the Year2004 Players Player of the Year – Bay Olympic NZ2001 Port Moresby Soccer Association Striker of the Year1999 OFC Futsal All-Star Team1998 Alitalia Young Rising Star Award – Australian Futsal National LeagueAll Time Top Scorer – PNG National Team (15 Goals)

References

External links
 
 

1980 births
Living people
Papua New Guinean footballers
Papua New Guinea international footballers
Papua New Guinean expatriate footballers
People from the National Capital District (Papua New Guinea)
Kossa F.C. players
Association football forwards
Association football midfielders
2002 OFC Nations Cup players
2012 OFC Nations Cup players
Expatriate soccer players in Australia
Expatriate footballers in the Solomon Islands
Expatriate association footballers in New Zealand
Papua New Guinean expatriate sportspeople in Australia
Papua New Guinean expatriate sportspeople in the Solomon Islands
Papua New Guinean expatriate sportspeople in New Zealand